"Pieces of April" is a ballad written by Dave Loggins which became a Top 20 hit for Three Dog Night in January 1973.

Three Dog Night version
First recorded by Loggins himself for his 1972 debut album Personal Belongings, "Pieces of April" was recorded for the 1972 Three Dog Night album Seven Separate Fools produced and arranged by Richard Podolor with Three Dog Night themselves credited as co-arrangers. According to Three Dog Night vocalist Chuck Negron, the group's two other vocalist Danny Hutton and Cory Wells left London where the Seven Separate Fools album was being recorded before the album was complete, necessitating Negron recording the album's final two tracks - which included "Pieces of April" - without them. As a result, "Pieces of April" would become the second of the two Three Dog Night single not to feature all three of the group's vocalists at least on background vocals (the first being their inaugural Hot 100 single: the 1969 release "Try a Little Tenderness" sung by Wells).

Released in October 1972 as the followup to the #1 hit "Black and White", "Pieces of April" was an atypically delicate Three Dog Night track, being particularly distinct from the rollicking "Black and White",  and "Pieces of April" would not become one of Three Dog Night's biggest hits, rising no higher than #19 on the Hot 100 in Billboard magazine whose Easy Listening hit ranking afforded "Pieces of April" a #6 peak. In Canada, "Pieces of April" ranked as high as #14 on the national hit parade featured in RPM magazine, whose Easy Listening survey ranked the track as high as #9.

Other versions
The song's composer Dave Loggins had recorded "Pieces of April" for his 1972 debut album Personal Belongings from which it was single-released in January 1973 which month the Three Dog Night version reached the Top 20, Loggins' single evidently being an attempt (unsuccessful) to generate a C&W hit. Loggins would remake "Pieces of April" for his final album: the 1979 release Dave Loggins, from which "Pieces of April" was single-released to become an Easy Listening hit, ranking as high as #22 on the Adult Contemporary chart in Billboard
Andy Williams recorded "Pieces of April" for his 1972 album, Alone Again (Naturally).
Johnny Mathis recorded "Pieces of April" in the 1972 sessions for his album Me and Mrs. Jones: the track was shelved being unreleased until 2017 when it was issued as a bonus track on the CD release of Me and Mrs. Jones and also on the box set entitled The Voice of Romance: The Columbia Original Album Collection.
Twiggy recorded "Pieces of April" for her 1976 self-titled album.

References

1972 songs
1972 singles
1979 singles
Songs written by Dave Loggins
Three Dog Night songs
Andy Williams songs
Dave Loggins songs
Dunhill Records singles
Epic Records singles